Tohma Bridge, also known as Martyr Gaffar Güneş Bridge (Şehit Gaffar Güneş Köprüsü), is a road bridge in Malatya Province, eastern Turkey.

The bridge crosses the Karakaya Dam reservoir on the State road D.875 between the provinces Malatya and Sivas. It is to connect Eastern Anatolia and Southeastern Anatolia regions with Black Sea Region via Malatya. 

Started in 2018, it was designed as a box girder bridge and 
built with prestressed concrete using incremental launch method by PYES Co. under the contractor Ziver İnşaat Co. For the construction of the bridge were  concrete, 2,700 tons steel for girders of  dimension and  bored pile used. It features seismic base isolators on both ends to withstand earthquakes. It carries two lanes in each direction.

References

Road bridges in Turkey
Bridges completed in 2021
2021 establishments in Turkey
Buildings and structures in Malatya Province
Transport in Malatya Province
Box girder bridges